Spencer Williams (October 14, 1889 – July 14, 1965) was an American jazz and popular music composer, pianist, and singer. He is best known for his hit songs "Basin Street Blues", "I Ain't Got Nobody", "Royal Garden Blues", "I've Found a New Baby", "Everybody Loves My Baby", "Tishomingo Blues", and many others.

Biography
Spencer Williams was born in Vidalia, Louisiana, United States. He was educated at St. Charles University in New Orleans.

Williams was performing in Chicago by 1907, and moved to New York City about 1916.  After arriving in New York, he co-wrote several songs with Anton Lada of the Louisiana Five.  Among those songs was "Basin Street Blues", which became one of his most popular songs and is still recorded by musicians to this day.

Williams toured Europe with bands from 1925 to 1928; during this time he wrote for Josephine Baker at the Folies Bergère in Paris. Williams then returned to New York for a few years. At the end of the 1920s, Williams was tried but then acquitted on a charge of murder. In 1932, he moved to Europe, spending many years in London before moving to Stockholm in 1951. Williams was married to Pat Castleton (a stage name of Agnes Bage). They had two daughters together called Della and Lindy.

His hit songs include "Basin Street Blues", "I Ain't Got Nobody", "Royal Garden Blues", "Mahogany Hall Stomp", "I've Found a New Baby", "Everybody Loves My Baby", "Shimmy-Sha-Wobble", "Boodle Am Shake", "Tishomingo Blues", "Fireworks", "I Ain't Gonna Give Nobody None of My Jelly Roll", "Arkansas Blues", plus the dirty blues standard "Georgia Grind", "Paradise Blues", "When Lights Are Low", and "My Man o' War".

Williams returned to New York in 1957, before his death in Flushing, New York on July 14, 1965.

Williams was posthumously inducted into the Songwriters Hall of Fame in 1970.

References

External links
 Spencer Williams recordings at the Discography of American Historical Recordings

1889 births
1965 deaths
American jazz composers
American jazz pianists
American male pianists
Jazz musicians from New Orleans
Jazz musicians from New York (state)
American male jazz composers
20th-century American male musicians
20th-century American pianists